The Klemmbach, a small Black Forest stream, has its source in the southwestern Black Forest near a mountain pass between the summits of Blauen and Belchen.

It flows westward through Badenweiler, Müllheim and Neuenburg and empties into the Rhine in Neuenburg am Rhein.

References

Rivers of the Black Forest
Rivers of Baden-Württemberg
Rivers of Germany